Quantum is an Australian television show about science and technology that aired on ABC television for 16 years. It was first broadcast on 16 July 1985, and aired its last episode on 26 April 2001. Since then, the show has been replaced by Catalyst.
Quantum was preceded on the ABC by Towards 2000.

External links
 Quantum at the National Film and Sound Archive

Australian Broadcasting Corporation original programming
Australian non-fiction television series
1985 Australian television series debuts
2001 Australian television series endings
1990s Australian television series